The Firth Baronetcy, of the Flush, in the Parish of Birstall in the West Riding of the County of York, was a title in the Baronetage of the United Kingdom. It was created on the 20th of July, 1909, for Thomas Firth, head of T.F. Firth & Company upon his death. The title became extinct on the death of the second Baronet in 1936.

Firth baronets, of The Flush (1909)
Sir Thomas Freeman Firth, 1st Baronet (1825 – 1909), owner of T.F Firth & Company.
Sir Algernon Freeman Firth, 2nd Baronet (1856 – 1936)

References

Extinct baronetcies in the Baronetage of the United Kingdom